The Habibganj–Lokmanya Tilak Super Express, commonly referred as "Bhopal–Mumbai Express", is a weekly superfast express train which runs between Bhopal Habibganj railway station of Bhopal, the capital of Madhya Pradesh and Mumbai Lokmanya Tilak Terminus railway station of Mumbai, the capital of Maharashtra

Arrival and departure
It runs as train number 12154 from Bhopal Habibganj to Mumbai LTT on Friday. It leaves at 18.00 hrs and reaches at 7.30 hrs.

On reverse journey as train number 12153 from Mumbai LTT to Bhopal Habibganj on Thursday leaving at 16.25 hrs and reaching at 05.50 hrs next day.

Coach composition
The train is operated by Central railway. It rake is shared between train numbers 12173/12174 /12153/12154 /12161/12162 /12107/12108.It runs with LHB coaches

Catering service is provided by attached pantry car.

Locomotion
After 12 February 2014, this train is hauled end to end by a Bhusaval-based WAM-4 or WAP-4 as Central Railways has completed its DC-AC conversion on 12 February 2014 between Kalyan and LTT.

References

Transport in Bhopal
Transport in Mumbai
Express trains in India
Rail transport in Maharashtra
Rail transport in Madhya Pradesh